Mynydd Ceiswyn is a mountain in Wales. It is the peak south of Waun-oer in the Dyfi Hills. On the east side of the mountain is the valley of the Nant Ceiswyn, and Cwm Hengae lies to the south.

Two minor dip faults cross the mountain, and the Ceiswyn Formation is named after this mountain.

References 

Aberllefenni
Mountains and hills of Gwynedd
Mountains and hills of Snowdonia
Dyfi Hills